CMB Televisión is a Colombian local religious television channel, based in Bogotá. It is owned by the Centro Misionero Bethesda, a Christian congregation founded by pastor and former Senator Jorge Enrique Gómez. The broadcasting licence was granted by the National Television Commission on 9 January 2004. Broadcasts started in the second half of that year.

External links 
 Official site, includes live Windows Media stream

Television networks in Colombia
Television channels and stations established in 2004
Television stations in Colombia
Evangelical television networks
Spanish-language television stations